Stirlingia anethifolia is a shrub endemic to Western Australia.

It blooms between September and November producing yellow flowers.

It is found on undulating sand plains along the south coast in the Great Southern and Goldfields-Esperance regions of Western Australia where it grows in sandy-clay soils.

References

Eudicots of Western Australia
anethifolia
Endemic flora of Western Australia
Plants described in 1841
Taxa named by Robert Brown (botanist, born 1773)